Changzhou Benniu International Airport  is an airport in Changzhou, Jiangsu, China.

Airlines and destinations

See also
List of airports in China

References

Airports in Jiangsu
Buildings and structures in Changzhou
Transport in Changzhou
Airports established in 1986